161 Damascus Road is a historic house in Branford, Connecticut.  Built about 1750, it is a well-preserved example of mid-18th century colonial residential architecture.  It was listed on the National Register of Historic Places in 1988.

Description and history
Damascus Road is a major secondary through route traversing the east side of Branford in an east–west direction.  Number 161 is located on the south side, east of Patrick Lane and in front of a public school.  It is a -story wood-frame structure, with a side-gable roof and clapboarded exterior.  Its main facade is three bays wide, with small sash windows placed on either side of the centered entrance.  The entrance has a simply framed surround, as do the windows, and the building corners have narrow cornerboards.

By its style and construction, the house has been estimated to have a construction date of about 1750.  Alterations include the removal of its central chimney (at least above the roof line) in the late 20th century.  It was in the early 20th-century thought to be the Blackstone Homestead, but this was determined not to be the case by later research.  The house was for many years associated with a  farm property, which remained intact and associated with it until 1963, when most of that property was sold to the town for construction of the school.

See also
National Register of Historic Places listings in New Haven County, Connecticut

References

National Register of Historic Places in New Haven County, Connecticut
Houses on the National Register of Historic Places in Connecticut
Colonial architecture in the United States
Houses completed in 1750
Houses in Branford, Connecticut